WXCI (91.7 FM) is a student radio station broadcasting an educational format. Licensed to Danbury, Connecticut, United States, the station serves the Danbury area. The station is owned by Western Connecticut State University.

WXCI broadcasts to Connecticut and New York at 3,000 watts with a stereo transmitter on WCSU's Midtown Campus. It also streams its broadcasts on the Web.

The radio station obtained its FCC license to operate on 28 February 1973. The Station began at 12:30 pm local time with a student, Rob Abbett nicknamed Rabbett, with the words, "Good afternoon, this is FM radio station WXCI in Danbury beginning its first broadcast day." Before Abbett threw the switch to FM broadcasting, the station was AM carrier current and PA system in dorms and student center and, was at the time, located in Memorial Hall with the call letters WSCT. This station was started in 1968 by Bob Wilson. However, by 1973, events progressed to FM radio broadcast initially transmitting at 10 watts of power, WXCI upgraded to 760 watts in 1978. In 1982, WXCI was one of the first FM stations to focus on alternative rock, a format now common among US college radio stations. As one of a handful of stations playing alternative rock and new wave in the US in the early 1980s, WXCI helped popularize new bands and artists such as REM, Talking Heads, Elvis Costello, U2, Culture Club, Duran Duran, and Black Flag.

References

External links

Western Connecticut State University
Danbury, Connecticut
Mass media in Fairfield County, Connecticut
XCI
XCI
Radio stations established in 1973
New wave radio stations
1973 establishments in Connecticut